Apollo Bay Airport  is an airport located  west of Apollo Bay, Victoria, Australia.

See also
 List of airports in Victoria

References

External links
 Aerodromes Civil Aviation Safety Authority

Airports in Victoria (Australia)
Shire of Colac Otway